Betty Louise Bell is an American author and educator.

Background 
Bell was born on November 23, 1949, in Davis, Oklahoma. She is a scholar and fiction writer of Cherokee ancestry. She earned her PhD in 1985 from Ohio State University.

Career 
Bell is a former director of the Native American Studies Program and former assistant professor of American culture, English, and Women's Studies at the University of Michigan. Her areas of scholarly interest include Native American literature, Women's Studies, 19th-century American literature, and creative writing. Her first novel Faces in the Moon was published in 1994 and received favorable reviews. In addition, Bell has published critical articles on Native American Literature that emphasize the political and personal aspects of Native American identity.

Other works

 Faces in the Moon
 A Red Girl's Reasoning: Native American Women Writers and the Twentieth Century
 Reading Red: Feminism in Native America (Editor)
 Norton Anthology of Native America Literatures (Coeditor)

References

External links 
 Betty Louise Bell on "Notable Writers of Color" poster

1949 births
American women novelists
20th-century American novelists
Living people
American people of Cherokee descent
Ohio State University alumni
University of Michigan faculty
20th-century American women writers
Novelists from Michigan
First Nations novelists
People from Davis, Oklahoma
American women academics
21st-century American women
Native American women writers